Photosynthetica is a quarterly peer-reviewed scientific journal covering research on photosynthesis. It was established in 1967 and is published by the Institute of Experimental Botany of the Academy of Sciences of the Czech Republic. The editor-in-chief is Helena Synkova (Academy of Sciences of the Czech Republic). Up till 2019, the journal was published by Springer Science+Business Media.

Abstracting and indexing
The journal is abstracted and indexed in:

According to the Journal Citation Reports, the journal has a 2019 impact factor of 2.562.

References

External links

Biochemistry journals
Botany journals
English-language journals
Quarterly journals
Springer Science+Business Media academic journals
Publications established in 1967
Czech Academy of Sciences
1967 establishments in Czechoslovakia